A570 may refer to

 Amiga A570, an external CD-ROM drive for the Amiga 500 computer
 A570 road, a primary route in northern England
 Canon PowerShot A570, a digital camera released by Canon